Buskri is a rural locality (a selo) and the administrative centre of Buskrinsky Selsoviet, Dakhadayevsky District, Republic of Dagestan, Russia. The population was 686 as of 2010. There are 3 streets.

Geography 
Buskri is located 6 km northeast of Urkarakh (the district's administrative centre) by road. Gunakari and Dibgashi are the nearest rural localities.

Nationalities 
Dargins live there.

References 

Rural localities in Dakhadayevsky District